Edward Wadie Said (1 November 1935 – 24 September 2003) was a Palestinian American professor of literature at Columbia University, a public intellectual, and a founder of the academic field of postcolonial studies. Born in Mandatory Palestine, he was a citizen of the United States by way of his father, a U.S. Army veteran.

Educated in the Western canon at British and American schools, Said applied his education and bi-cultural perspective to illuminating the gaps of cultural and political understanding between the Western world and the Eastern world, especially about the Israeli–Palestinian conflict in the Middle East; his principal influences were Antonio Gramsci, Frantz Fanon, Aimé Césaire, Michel Foucault, and Theodor Adorno.

As a cultural critic, Said is known for the book Orientalism (1978), a critique of the cultural representations that are the bases of Orientalism—how the Western world perceives the Orient. Said's model of textual analysis transformed the academic discourse of researchers in literary theory, literary criticism, and Middle Eastern studies—how academics examine, describe, and define the cultures being studied. As a foundational text, Orientalism was controversial among scholars of Oriental studies, philosophy, and literature.

As a public intellectual, Said was a controversial member of the Palestinian National Council, due to his public criticism of Israel and the Arab countries, especially the political and cultural policies of Muslim régimes who acted against the national interests of their peoples. Said advocated the establishment of a Palestinian state to ensure equal political and human rights for the Palestinians in Israel, including the right of return to the homeland. He defined his oppositional relation with the status quo as the remit of the public intellectual who has "to sift, to judge, to criticize, to choose, so that choice and agency return to the individual" man and woman.

In 1999, with conductor Daniel Barenboim, Said co-founded the West–Eastern Divan Orchestra, based in Seville. Said was also an accomplished pianist, and, with Barenboim, co-authored the book Parallels and Paradoxes: Explorations in Music and Society (2002), a compilation of their conversations and public discussions about music held at New York's Carnegie Hall.

Life and career

Early life

Edward Wadie Said was born on 1 November 1935, to Hilda Said and Wadie Said, a businessman in Jerusalem, then part of the British mandate of Palestine (1920–1948). Wadie Said was a Palestinian who joined the American Expeditionary Forces in World War I. This war-time military service earned American citizenship for Said's father and his family. Edward's mother Hilda Said was of Palestinian and Lebanese parentage, born and raised in Nazareth, Ottoman Empire.

In 1919, in partnership with a cousin, Wadie Said established a stationery business in Cairo. Like her husband, Hilda Said was an Arab Christian, and the Said family practiced Protestantism.

Edward and his sister Rosemarie Saïd Zahlan (1937–2006) both pursued academic careers. He became an agnostic in his later years.

Education 
Said lived his boyhood between the worlds of Cairo and Jerusalem; in 1947, he attended St. George's School, Jerusalem, a British-style school whose teaching staff consisted of stern Anglicans. About being there, Said said:

By the late 1940s, Said's schooling included the Egyptian branch of Victoria College, where "classmates included Hussein of Jordan, and the Egyptian, Syrian, Jordanian, and Saudi Arabian boys whose academic careers would progress to their becoming ministers, prime ministers, and leading businessmen in their respective countries."

During the period of Palestinian history under the British mandate, the function of a European-style school such as the Victoria College was to educate selections of young men from the Arab and Levantine upper classes to become anglicized post-colonial politicians who would administer their countries upon decolonization. About Victoria College, Said said:

In 1951, Victoria College expelled Said, who had proved a troublesome boy, despite his academic achievements. He then attended Northfield Mount Hermon School, Massachusetts, a socially élite, college-prep boarding-school where he lived a difficult year of social alienation. Nonetheless, he excelled academically, and achieved the rank of either first (valedictorian) or second (salutatorian) in a class of one hundred sixty students.

In retrospect, being sent far from the Middle East he viewed as a parental decision much influenced by "the prospects of deracinated people, like us the Palestinians, being so uncertain that it would be best to send me as far away as possible." The realities of peripatetic life—of interwoven cultures, of feeling out of place, and of homesickness—so affected the schoolboy Edward that themes of dissonance feature in the work and worldview of the academic Said. At school's end, he had become Edward W. Said—a polyglot intellectual (fluent in English, French, and Arabic). He graduated with an A.B. in English from Princeton University in 1957 after completing a senior thesis titled "The Moral Vision: André Gide and Graham Greene." He later received Master of Arts (1960) and Doctor of Philosophy (1964) degrees in English Literature from Harvard University.

Career
In 1963, Said joined Columbia University as a member of the English and Comparative Literature faculties, where he taught and worked until 2003. In 1974, he was Visiting Professor of Comparative Literature at Harvard; during the 1975–76 period, he was a Fellow of the Center for Advanced Study in Behavioral Science, at Stanford University. In 1977, he became the Parr Professor of English and Comparative Literature at Columbia University, and subsequently was the Old Dominion Foundation Professor in the Humanities; and in 1979 was Visiting Professor of Humanities at Johns Hopkins University.

Said also worked as a visiting professor at Yale University, and lectured at more than 200 other universities in North America, Europe, and the Middle East. In 1992, Said was promoted to full professor. Editorially, Said served as president of the Modern Language Association, as editor of the Arab Studies Quarterly in the American Academy of Arts and Sciences, on the executive board of International PEN, and was a member of the American Academy of Arts and Letters, the Royal Society of Literature, the Council of Foreign Relations, and the American Philosophical Society. In 1993, Said presented the BBC's annual Reith Lectures, a six-lecture series titled Representation of the Intellectual, wherein he examined the role of the public intellectual in contemporary society, which the BBC published in 2011.

In his work, Said frequently researches the term and concept of the cultural archive, especially in his book Culture and Imperialism (1993). He states the cultural archive is a major site where investments in imperial conquest are developed, and that these archives include "narratives, histories, and travel tales." Said emphasizes the role of the Western imperial project in the disruption of cultural archives, and theorizes that disciplines such as comparative literature, English, and anthropology can be directly linked to the concept of empire.

Literary production
 
Said's first published book, Joseph Conrad and the Fiction of Autobiography (1966), was an expansion of the doctoral dissertation he presented to earn the PhD degree. Abdirahman Hussein said in Edward Saïd: Criticism and Society (2010), that Conrad's novella Heart of Darkness (1899) was "foundational to Said's entire career and project". In Beginnings: Intention and Method (1974), Said analyzed the theoretical bases of literary criticism by drawing on the insights of Vico, Valéry, Nietzsche, de Saussure, Lévi-Strauss, Husserl, and Foucault. Said's later works included 

 The World, the Text, and the Critic (1983), 
 Nationalism, Colonialism, and Literature: Yeats and Decolonization (1988), 
 Culture and Imperialism (1993), 
 Representations of the Intellectual: The 1993 Reith Lectures (1994), 
 Humanism and Democratic Criticism (2004), and 
 On Late Style (2006).

Orientalism

Said became an established cultural critic with the book Orientalism (1978), a critique of Orientalism as the source of the false cultural representations with which the Western world perceives the Middle East—the narratives of how The West sees The East. The thesis of Orientalism proposes the existence of a "subtle and persistent Eurocentric prejudice against Arabo–Islamic peoples and their culture", which originates from Western culture's long tradition of false, romanticized images of Asia, in general, and the Middle East in particular. Such cultural representations have served, and continue to serve, as implicit justifications for the colonial and imperial ambitions of the European powers and of the U.S. Likewise, Said denounced the political and the cultural malpractices of the régimes of the ruling Arab élites who have internalized the false and romanticized representations of Arabic culture that were created by Anglo–American Orientalists.

Orientalism proposed that much Western study of Islamic civilization was political intellectualism, meant for the self-affirmation of European identity, rather than objective academic study; thus, the academic field of Oriental studies functioned as a practical method of cultural discrimination and imperialist domination—that is to say, the Western Orientalist knows more about "the Orient" than do "the Orientals".

According to Said, the cultural representations of the Eastern world that Orientalism purveys are intellectually suspect, and cannot be accepted as faithful, true, and accurate representations of the peoples and things of the Orient. Moreover, the history of European colonial rule and political domination of Asian civilizations distorts the writing of even the most knowledgeable, well-meaning, and culturally sympathetic Orientalist.

Western Art, Orientalism continues, has misrepresented the Orient with stereotypes since Antiquity, as in the tragedy The Persians (472 BCE), by Aeschylus, where the Greek protagonist falls because he misperceived the true nature of The Orient. The European political domination of Asia has biased even the most outwardly objective Western texts about The Orient, to a degree unrecognized by the Western scholars who appropriated for themselves the production of cultural knowledge—the academic work of studying, exploring, and interpreting the languages, histories, and peoples of Asia. Therefore, Orientalist scholarship implies that the colonial subaltern (the colonised people) were incapable of thinking, acting, or speaking for themselves, thus are incapable of writing their own national histories. In such imperial circumstances, the Orientalist scholars of the West wrote the history of the Orient—and so constructed the modern, cultural identities of Asia—from the perspective that the West is the cultural standard to emulate, the norm from which the "exotic and inscrutable" Orientals deviate.

Criticism of Orientalism

Orientalism provoked much professional and personal criticism for Said among academics. Traditional Orientalists, such as Albert Hourani, Robert Graham Irwin, Nikki Keddie, Bernard Lewis, and Kanan Makiya, suffered negative consequences, because Orientalism affected public perception of their intellectual integrity and the quality of their Orientalist scholarship. The historian Keddie said that Said's critical work about the field of Orientalism had caused, in their academic disciplines:

In Orientalism, Said described Bernard Lewis, the Anglo–American Orientalist, as "a perfect exemplification [of an] Establishment Orientalist [whose work] purports to be objective, liberal scholarship, but is, in reality, very close to being propaganda against his subject material."

Lewis responded with a harsh critique of Orientalism accusing Said of politicizing the scientific study of the Middle East (and Arabic studies in particular); neglecting to critique the scholarly findings of the Orientalists; and giving "free rein" to his biases.

Said retorted that in The Muslim Discovery of Europe (1982), Lewis responded to his thesis with the claim that the Western quest for knowledge about other societies was unique in its display of disinterested curiosity, which Muslims did not reciprocate towards Europe. Lewis was saying that "knowledge about Europe [was] the only acceptable criterion for true knowledge." The appearance of academic impartiality was part of Lewis's role as an academic authority for zealous "anti–Islamic, anti–Arab, Zionist, and Cold War crusades." Moreover, in the Afterword to the 1995 edition of the book, Said replied to Lewis's criticisms of the first edition of Orientalism (1978).

Influence of Orientalism

In the academy, Orientalism became a foundational text of the field of post-colonial studies, for what the British intellectual Terry Eagleton said is the book's "central truth ... that demeaning images of the East, and imperialist incursions into its terrain, have historically gone hand in hand."

Both Said's supporters and his critics acknowledge the transformative influence of Orientalism upon scholarship in the humanities; critics say that the thesis is an intellectually limiting influence upon scholars, whilst supporters say that the thesis is intellectually liberating. The fields of post-colonial and cultural studies attempt to explain the "post-colonial world, its peoples, and their discontents", for which the techniques of investigation and efficacy in Orientalism, proved especially applicable in Middle Eastern studies.

As such, the investigation and analysis Said applied in Orientalism proved especially practical in literary criticism and cultural studies, such as the post-colonial histories of India by Gyan Prakash, Nicholas Dirks and Ronald Inden, modern Cambodia by Simon Springer, and the literary theories of Homi K. Bhabha, Gayatri Chakravorty Spivak and Hamid Dabashi (Iran: A People Interrupted, 2007).

In Eastern Europe, Milica Bakić–Hayden developed the concept of Nesting Orientalisms (1992), derived from the ideas of the historian Larry Wolff (Inventing Eastern Europe: The Map of Civilization on the Mind of the Enlightenment, 1994) and Said's ideas in Orientalism (1978). The Bulgarian historian Maria Todorova (Imagining the Balkans, 1997) presented the ethnologic concept of Nesting Balkanisms (Ethnologia Balkanica, 1997), which is derived from Milica Bakić–Hayden's concept of Nesting Orientalisms.

In The Impact of "Biblical Orientalism" in Late Nineteenth- and Early Twentieth-Century Palestine (2014), the historian Lorenzo Kamel, presented the concept of "Biblical Orientalism" with an historical analysis of the simplifications of the complex, local Palestinian reality, which occurred from the 1830s until the early 20th century. Kamel said that the selective usage and simplification of religion, in approaching the place known as "The Holy Land", created a view that, as a place, the Holy Land has no human history other than as the place where Bible stories occurred, rather than as Palestine, a country inhabited by many peoples.

The post-colonial discourse presented in Orientalism, also influenced post-colonial theology and post-colonial biblical criticism, by which method the analytical reader approaches a scripture from the perspective of a colonial reader. See: The Bible and Zionism: Invented Traditions, Archaeology and Post-colonialism in Palestine–Israel (2007). Another book in this area is Postcolonial Theory (1998), by Leela Gandhi, explains Post-colonialism in terms of how it can be applied to the wider philosophical and intellectual context of history.

Politics
In 1967, consequent to the Six-Day War (5–10 June 1967), Said became a public intellectual when he acted politically to counter the stereotyped misrepresentations (factual, historical, cultural) with which the U.S. news media explained the Arab–Israeli wars; reportage divorced from the historical realities of the Middle East, in general, and Palestine and Israel, in particular. To address, explain, and correct such Orientalism, Said published "The Arab Portrayed" (1968), a descriptive essay about images of "the Arab" that are meant to evade specific discussion of the historical and cultural realities of the peoples (Jews, Christians, Muslims) who are the Middle East, featured in journalism (print, photograph, television) and some types of scholarship (specialist journals).

In the essay "Zionism from the Standpoint of its Victims" (1979), Said argued in favour of the political legitimacy and philosophic authenticity of the Zionist claims and right to a Jewish homeland; and for the inherent right of national self-determination of the Palestinian people. Said's books about Israel and Palestine include The Question of Palestine (1979), The Politics of Dispossession (1994), and The End of the Peace Process (2000).

Palestinian National Council
From 1977 until 1991, Said was an independent member of the Palestinian National Council (PNC). In 1988, he was a proponent of the two-state solution to the Israeli–Palestinian conflict, and voted for the establishment of the State of Palestine at a meeting of the PNC in Algiers. In 1993, Said quit his membership in the Palestinian National Council, to protest the internal politics that led to the signing of the Oslo Accords (Declaration of Principles on Interim Self-Government Arrangements, 1993), which he thought had unacceptable terms, and because the terms had been rejected by the Madrid Conference of 1991.

Said disliked the Oslo Accords for not producing an independent State of Palestine, and because they were politically inferior to a plan that Yasir Arafat had rejected—a plan Said had presented to Arafat on behalf of the U.S. government in the late 1970s. Especially troublesome to Said was his belief that Yasir Arafat had betrayed the right of return of the Palestinian refugees to their houses and properties in the Green Line territories of pre-1967 Israel, and that Arafat ignored the growing political threat of the Israeli settlements in the occupied territories that had been established since the conquest of Palestine in 1967.

In 1995, in response to Said's political criticisms, the Palestinian Authority (PA) banned the sale of Said's books; however, the PA lifted the book ban when Said publicly praised Yasir Arafat for rejecting Prime Minister Ehud Barak's offers at the Middle East Peace Summit at Camp David (2000) in the U.S.

In the mid-1990s, Said wrote the foreword to the history book Jewish History, Jewish Religion: The Weight of Three Thousand Years (1994), by Israel Shahak, about Jewish fundamentalism, which presents the cultural proposition that Israel's mistreatment of the Palestinians is rooted in a Judaic requirement (of permission) for Jews to commit crimes, including murder, against Gentiles (non-Jews). In his foreword, Said said that Jewish History, Jewish Religion is "nothing less than a concise history of classic and modern Judaism, insofar as these are relevant to the understanding of modern Israel"; and praised the historian Shahak for describing contemporary Israel as a nation subsumed in a "Judeo–Nazi" cultural ambiance that allowed the dehumanization of the Palestinian Other:

In 1998, Said made In Search of Palestine (1998), a BBC documentary film about Palestine, past and present. In the company of his son, Wadie, Said revisited the places of his boyhood, and confronted injustices meted out to ordinary Palestinians in the contemporary West Bank. Despite the social and cultural prestige afforded to BBC cinema products in the U.S., the documentary was never broadcast by any American television company. In 1999, the American Jewish public affairs monthly Commentary cited ledgers kept at the Land Registry Office in Jerusalem during the Mandatory period as background for his boyhood recollections, claiming that his "Palestinian boyhood" was, in fact, no more than occasional visits from Cairo, where his parents lived, owned a business and raised their family.

In Palestine
On 3 July 2000, whilst touring the Middle East with his son, Wadie, Said was photographed throwing a stone across the Blue Line Lebanese–Israel border, which image elicited much political criticism about his action demonstrating an inherent, personal sympathy with terrorism; and, in Commentary magazine, the journalist Edward Alexander labelled Said as "The Professor of Terror", for aggression against Israel. Said explained the stone-throwing as a two-fold action, personal and political; a man-to-man contest-of-skill, between a father and his son, and an Arab man's gesture of joy at the end of the Israeli occupation of southern Lebanon (1985–2000): "It was a pebble; there was nobody there. The guardhouse was at least half a mile away."

Despite having denied that he aimed the stone at an Israeli guardhouse, the Beirut newspaper As-Safir (The Ambassador) reported that a Lebanese local resident reported that Said was at less than ten metres (ca. 30 ft.) distance from the Israeli Defense Force (IDF) soldiers manning the two-storey guardhouse, when Said aimed and threw the stone over the border fence; the stone's projectile path was thwarted when it struck the barbed wire atop the border fence. Nonetheless, in the U.S., despite a political fracas by students at Columbia University and the Anti-Defamation League of B'nai B'rith International (Sons of the Covenant), the university provost published a five-page letter defending Said's action as an academic's freedom of expression: "To my knowledge, the stone was directed at no-one; no law was broken; no indictment was made; no criminal or civil action has been taken against Professor Saïd."

Nevertheless, Said endured political repercussions, such as the cancellation of an invitation to give a lecture to the Freud Society, in Austria, in February 2001. The President of the Freud Society justified withdrawing the invitation by explaining to Said that "the political situation in the Middle East, and its consequences" had rendered an accusation of anti-Semitism a very serious matter, and that any such accusation "has become more dangerous" in the politics of Austria; thus, the Freud Society cancelled its invitation to Said in order to "avoid an internal clash" of opinions, about him, that might ideologically divide the Freud Society. In Culture and Resistance: Conversations with Edward Saïd (2003), Said likened his political situation to the situation that Noam Chomsky has endured as a public intellectual: "It's very similar to his. He's a well-known, great linguist. He's been celebrated and honored for that, but he's also vilified as an anti–Semite and as a Hitler worshiper. ... For anyone to deny the horrendous experience of anti–Semitism and the Holocaust is unacceptable. We don't want anybody's history of suffering to go unrecorded and unacknowledged. On the other hand, there's a great difference, between acknowledging Jewish oppression and using that as a cover for the oppression of another people."

Criticism of U.S. foreign policy
In the revised edition of Covering Islam: How the Media and the Experts Determine How We See the Rest of the World (1997), Said criticized the Orientalist bias of the Western news media's reportage about the Middle East and Islam, especially the tendency to editorialize "speculations about the latest conspiracy to blow up buildings, sabotage commercial airliners, and poison water supplies." He criticized the American military involvement in the Kosovo War (1998–99) as an imperial action; and described the Iraq Liberation Act (1998), promulgated during the Clinton Administration, as the political license that predisposed the U.S. to invade Iraq in 2003, which was authorised with the Iraq Resolution (2 October 2002); and the continual support of Israel by successive U.S. presidential governments, as actions meant to perpetuate regional political instability in the Middle East.

In the event, despite being sick with leukemia, as a public intellectual, Said continued criticising the U.S. Invasion of Iraq in mid-2003; and, in the Egyptian Al-Ahram Weekly newspaper, in the article "Resources of Hope" (2 April 2003), Said said that the U.S. war against Iraq was a politically ill-conceived military enterprise:

Under surveillance
In 2003, Haidar Abdel-Shafi, Ibrahim Dakak, Mustafa Barghouti, and Said established Al-Mubadara (The Palestinian National Initiative), headed by Dr. Mustafa Barghouti,  a third-party reformist, democratic party meant to be an alternative to the usual two-party politics of Palestine. As a political party, the ideology of Al-Mubadara is specifically an alternative to the extremist politics of the social-democratic Fatah and the Islamist Hamas. Said's founding of the group, as well as his other international political activities concerning Palestine, were noticed by the U.S. government, and Said came under FBI surveillance, which became more intensive after 1972. David Price, an anthropologist  at Evergreen State College, requested the FBI file on Said through the Freedom of Information Act on behalf of CounterPunch and published a report there on his findings. The released pages of Said's FBI files show that the FBI read Said's books and reported on their contents to Washington.

Music

Besides having been a public intellectual, Edward Said was an accomplished pianist, worked as the music critic for The Nation magazine, and wrote four books about music: Musical Elaborations (1991); Parallels and Paradoxes: Explorations in Music and Society (2002), with Daniel Barenboim as co-author; On Late Style: Music and Literature Against the Grain (2006); and Music at the Limits (2007) in which final book he spoke of finding musical reflections of his literary and historical ideas in bold compositions and strong performances.

Elsewhere in the musical world, the composer Mohammed Fairouz acknowledged the deep influence of Edward Said upon his works; compositionally, Fairouz's First Symphony thematically alludes to the essay "Homage to a Belly-Dancer" (1990), about Tahia Carioca, the Egyptian dancer, actress, and political militant; and a piano sonata, titled Reflections on Exile (1984), which thematically refers to the emotions inherent to being an exile.

In 1999, Said and Barenboim co-founded the West-Eastern Divan Orchestra, composed of young Israeli, Palestinian, and Arab musicians. They also established The Barenboim–Said Foundation in Seville, to develop education-through-music projects. Besides managing the West–Eastern Divan Orchestra, the Barenboim–Said Foundation assists with the administration of the Academy of Orchestral Studies, the Musical Education in Palestine Project, and the Early Childhood Musical Education Project, in Seville.

Honors and awards
Besides honors, memberships, and postings to prestigious organizations worldwide, Edward Said was awarded some twenty honorary university degrees in the course of his professional life as an academic, critic, and Man of Letters. Among the honors bestowed to him were:

 the Bowdoin Prize by Harvard University. 
 He twice received the Lionel Trilling Book Award; the first occasion was the inaugural bestowing of said literary award in 1976, for Beginnings: Intention and Method (1974). He also received the 
 Wellek Prize of the American Comparative Literature Association
 The inaugural Spinoza Lens Prize. 
 Lannan Literary Award for Lifetime Achievement in 2001
 Prince of Asturias Award for Concord in 2002 (shared with Daniel Barenboim). 
 First U.S. citizen to receive the Sultan Owais Prize (for Cultural & Scientific Achievements, 1996–1997). 
 The autobiography Out of Place (1999) was bestowed three awards, the 1999 New Yorker Book Award for Non-Fiction; the 2000 Anisfield-Wolf Book Award for Non-Fiction; and the Morton Dauwen Zabel Award in Literature.

Death and legacy

On 24 September 2003, after enduring a 12-year sickness with chronic lymphocytic leukemia, Said died, at 67 years of age, in New York City. He was survived by his wife, Mariam C. Said, his son, Wadie Said, and his daughter, Najla Said. The eulogists included Alexander Cockburn ("A Mighty and Passionate Heart"); Seamus Deane ("A Late Style of Humanism"); Christopher Hitchens ("A Valediction for Edward Said"); Tony Judt ("The Rootless Cosmopolitan"); Michael Wood ("On Edward Said"); and Tariq Ali ("Remembering Edward Said, 1935–2003"). Said is buried in the Protestant Cemetery in Broumana, Jabal Lubnan, Lebanon. His headstone indicates he died on 25 September 2003.

In November 2004, in Palestine, Birzeit University renamed their music school the Edward Said National Conservatory of Music.

The tributes to Said include books and schools; such as Waiting for the Barbarians: A Tribute to Edward W. Said (2008) features essays by Akeel Bilgrami, Rashid Khalidi, and Elias Khoury; Edward Said: The Charisma of Criticism (2010), by Harold Aram Veeser, a critical biography; and Edward Said: A Legacy of Emancipation and Representations (2010), essays by Joseph Massad, Ilan Pappé, Ella Shohat, Ghada Karmi, Noam Chomsky, Gayatri Chakravorty Spivak, and Daniel Barenboim. The Barenboim–Said Academy (Berlin) was established in 2012. 

In 2002, Sheikh Zayed bin Sultan Al Nayhan, the founder and president of the United Arab Emirates, and others endowed the Edward Said Chair at Columbia University; it is currently filled by Rashid Khalidi. 

In 2016, California State University at Fresno started examining applicants for a newly created Professorship in Middle East Studies named after Edward Said, but after months of examining applicants, Fresno State canceled the search. Some observers claim that the cancellation was due to pressure from some individuals and groups.

See also

 Edward Said bibliography
 List of Columbia University people
 List of peace activists
 Projects working for peace among Arabs and Israelis
 Z Communications
 Orientalism

References

Citations

Sources

Further reading
 Brennan, Timothy. Places of Mind: A Life of Edward Said (2021). online review 
 Kennedy, Valerie. Edward Said: A Critical Introduction. Key Contemporary Thinkers. Malden, MA: Wiley-Blackwell, 2000.
 McCarthy, Conor. The Cambridge Introduction to Edward Said. Cambridge: Cambridge University Press, 2010.
  .
 Rubin, Andrew N. ed. Humanism, Freedom, and the Critic: Edward W. Said and After. Washington, D.C.: Georgetown University Press, 2005.
 Said, Edward W. Moustafa Bayoumi, et al. The Selected Works of Edward Said, 1966 – 2006 (2019) excerpt

External links

 Edward Said, 2000: My Encounter with Sartre, London Review of Books
 
 Review of Reflections on Exile and Other Essays and Edward Said: The Last Interview, in Other Voices, vol. 3, no. 1.
 
 
 Finding aid to Edward Said papers at Columbia University – Rare Book & Manuscript Library

1935 births
2003 deaths
 
American political writers
American male non-fiction writers
Palestinian political writers
Postcolonial literature
Orientalism
Scholars of nationalism
Middle Eastern studies in the United States
Islam and politics
Anti-Zionism in the United States
American literary critics
Palestinian literary critics
American humanists
American activists
Palestinian activists
20th-century American non-fiction writers
21st-century American non-fiction writers
Harvard University alumni
Princeton University alumni
Columbia University faculty
American writers of Palestinian descent
American writers of Lebanese descent
American agnostics
Palestinian agnostics
Palestinian people of Lebanese descent
People from Jerusalem
Deaths from cancer in New York (state)
Deaths from leukemia
The Nation (U.S. magazine) people
Center for Advanced Study in the Behavioral Sciences fellows
Northfield Mount Hermon School alumni
American Book Award winners
20th-century American male writers
21st-century American male writers
Presidents of the Modern Language Association
Said family